"Jump Around" is a song by British YouTuber and rapper KSI from his second extended play (EP) of the same name. The song features a guest appearance from American rapper Waka Flocka Flame. It is a remake of "Jump Around" (1992) by House of Pain. The song was released for digital download and streaming by Island Records and Universal Music Group on 16 September 2016 as the third single from the EP.

The remake was met with mixed reviews from music critics, but most praised the song's high-octane energy. An accompanying music video was released on 3 October 2016. The video stars the two rappers among a crowd of people, taking to the streets to cause carnage and jumping around and dancing.

Writing and production 

In early 2016, KSI recorded a remake of the song "Jump Around" (1992) by American hip hop group House of Pain. It was not intended to be released as a single or have a featured artist. KSI explained, "I didn’t want to release it as a single. I wanted to just quietly release it on [the] EP." During a recording studio session with Sway and DJ Turkish in England, American rapper Waka Flocka Flame was played some of KSI's unreleased songs, including his version of "Jump Around" which Waka Flocka Flame "was going nuts over". Waka Flocka Flame asked if he could feature on "Jump Around", which later led to the decision to release it as a single. Speaking about his remake of "Jump Around", KSI affirmed, "I feel like I’ve done well with my take on it." He continued, "The song just makes you wanna go crazy, especially the chorus.”

Release and promotion 
"Jump Around" was first teased when a 15 seconds-long snippet of the song and its music video appeared at the end of the music video for KSI's previous single "Friends with Benefits" (2016), which was released on 5 August 2016. "Jump Around" was made available to pre-order on digital download services and pre-save on streaming services on the same day. "Jump Around" was released for digital download and streaming by Island Records and Universal Music Group on 16 September 2016 as the third single from KSI's second extended play (EP) of the same name.

Critical reception 
KSI's remake of "Jump Around" was met with mixed reviews from music critics. Andrew Trendell of NME called it a "feel-good anthem" and "a high octane take on the House Of Pain classic". Liam Luangrathrajasombat of Playback Society praised KSI and Waka Flocka Flame for "[bringing] a fresh 2016 flow to an aged classic" and acclaimed that the song has "a banging beat that would light up the club." In his review for Lost In The Manor, Tim Hakki wrote that although KSI's "flippant take on hip hop isn’t really for everyone", "Jump Around" is "definitely the most immediate highlight of his [music] career so far". Hakki continued, "KSI’s flow sets a great vibe, before Waka [Flocka Flame] arrives and completely slays with his beastly delivery." Hakki remarked that the song is "jump-hop of the highest calibre" and the listener will be "pinging off the walls by the end of it". On the other hand, in their review of "Jump Around", the staff of String Buzz claimed, "There is no innovation, variation or imagination with this track. It is a beat-for-beat remake with some shoddy lyrics." They said that "the delivery [and] vocal performance [are] a saving grace" because the lyrics are "belted out with enthusiasm", but they found that "the tone of [KSI's] voice [does] become grating by the final chorus". Nonetheless, they concluded that "decent production keeps this song from being a car crash". They said, "The beat sounds thick and wholesome, the instrumentation sounds well mixed and the vocals fit in to the overall sound very well."

Music video 
The music video for "Jump Around" was filmed in the United States. A trailer for the music video was released on 19 September 2016. The music video was released to KSI's Vevo channel on YouTube on 3 October 2016. It has received 14 million views. In the music video, KSI wreaks havoc in a convenience store, before taking to the streets to cause carnage. KSI then heads down to Waka Flocka Flame's court, where they are accompanied by a large crowd of people, including police officers, jumping around and dancing. Andrew Trendell of NME called it a "huge video" and Liam Luangrathrajasombat of Playback Society described it as a "fun-filled video". When asked about his favourite element of the music video shoot, KSI responded, "Just the energy. Literally, it was mad. I was out of breath after every shot.

Use in other media 
KSI's remake of "Jump Around" was used in the trailer for the animated film Playmobil: The Movie (2019).

"Jump Around" was used briefly in the trailer for the animated film DC League of Super-Pets (2022).

Credits and personnel 
Credits adapted from Tidal.

 KSIsongwriting, vocals
 Waka Flocka Flamesongwriting, vocals
 Swayproduction, songwriting, recording engineering, vocal arranging
 DJ Turkishproduction, mixing, mastering, recording engineering
 Charles Cookproduction
 Dave Appellsongwriting
 Kal Mannsongwriting
 DJ Muggssongwriting

Charts

Release history

References

External links 
 

2016 songs
2016 singles
KSI songs
Waka Flocka Flame songs
Songs written by KSI
Songs written by Waka Flocka Flame
Songs written by Sway (musician)
Songs written by Dave Appell
Songs with lyrics by Kal Mann
Songs written by DJ Muggs
Island Records singles
Universal Music Group singles